Head cleaner or headcleaner can refer to:
 Tape head cleaner, a substance or device used for cleaning the record/playback heads of a magnetic tape drive such as in a video or audio tape machine
 Cleaning card, card magnetic stripe magnetic head cleaner

Headcleaner (album), 1988 album by Lime Spiders
Headcleaner, 1998 album by I Against I  
"Headcleaner", song from Tabula Rasa, a 1993 album by Einstürzende Neubauten
Headcleaner, band signed by Network 23